Umarov is a masculine surname common in the southern parts of the former Soviet Union, its feminine counterpart is Umarova. Notable people with the surname include:
Akram Umarov (born 1994), Kyrgyzstani football player
 Dokka Umarov (1964–2013), Chechen militant
Gadzhi Umarov (born 1985), Russian taekwondo practitioner
 Kairat Umarov (born 1963), Kazakh Ambassador to the United States
Liliya Umarova (born 1996), Uzbekistani water polo player
 Liza Umarova (born 1965), Chechen singer and actress
Makhmud Umarov (1924–1961), Kazakhstani sport shooter
Muhibullo Abdulkarim Umarov, Tajikistan citizen held in the Guantanamo Bay detainment camps 
Rizvan Umarov (born 1993), Azerbaijani football player 
 Sanjar Umarov (born 1956), Uzbek politician and businessman